Bhojipura Assembly constituency is one of the 403 constituencies of the Uttar Pradesh Legislative Assembly, India. It is a part of the Bareilly district and one of the five assembly constituencies in the Bareilly Lok Sabha constituency. First election in this assembly constituency was held in 1957 after the "DPACO (1956)" (delimitation order) was passed in 1956. After the "Delimitation of Parliamentary and Assembly Constituencies Order" was passed in 2008, the constituency was assigned identification number 120.

Wards / Areas
Extent of Bhojipura Assembly constituency is KC Shergarh, Devraniya NP &  Shergarh NP of Baheri Tehsil; KCs Bhojipura, Rithora, CB Ganj, Rithora NP, Dhaura Tanda NP & Pipalsana Chaudhdhari (CT) of Bareilly Tehsil.

Popular Village- Jadounpur is a village which was established in 1873 AD  by two families, one of Bajajas (kade Ansari)
and the other Chaudhdharis (unknown).
Bajaj means one who sells clothes 
and Chaudhdhari is interested in politics;
both these families are Ansari by caste and Muslims by religion. It is very popular for incremented marketing and business.
Through origin traced by historians of 19th century, it was clearly observed that there were some intercaste groups of Rajput clans known as Jadon, who were the initial settlers in this village.

Members of the Legislative Assembly

Election results

2022

2012
16th Vidhan Sabha: 2012 General  Elections

Notable people

 Bahoran Lal Maurya - MLA
 Yogesh Patel - Block Pramukh: After not getting ticket from BJP, he resigned and joined BSP
 Rajendra Pal Gangwar - Former Block Pramukh

See also
Bareilly Lok Sabha constituency
Bareilly district
Sixteenth Legislative Assembly of Uttar Pradesh
Uttar Pradesh Legislative Assembly
Vidhan Bhawan

References

External links
 

Politics of Bareilly district
Assembly constituencies of Uttar Pradesh
Constituencies established in 1956